The Eastern Hama offensive (2017) was a military operation conducted by the Syrian Army against Islamic State of Iraq and the Levant (ISIL) with the goal to secure the Ithriyah-Sheikh Hilal road, the government supply line towards Aleppo, and advance towards Wadi Auzain.

The offensive

On 31 May, the Syrian Arab Army and its allies, supported by the Russian Air Force, began an offensive towards the IS stronghold of Uqayribat, in the eastern part of the Salamiyah District in Hama Governorate. The next day, a new batch of government reinforcements arrived for the offensive. Uqayribat had been used by ISIL as a launching pad for attacks on Salamiyah. On 3 June, Syrian and Russian warplanes carried out more than 30 air strikes ISIL positions. Heavy artillery and missiles were also used.

During the morning of 5 June, the Syrian Arab Army, supported by the NDF, started an operation on a second axis against ISIL to the south of Sheikh Hilal. Before the ground attack, ISIL positions were hit by non-stop air strikes and artillery shelling. The next day, the Army captured two towns south-east of Sheikh Hilal.

On 12 June, the Syrian Army sent technicals, anti-aircraft guns and artillery pieces mounted on trucks to the area. Four days later, government forces restarted the offensive, capturing the large hilltop of Tal Dabbart Debah and then shifting their attention to the Aqareb Dam. During 18 June, the Army captured four villages north of Uqayribat, along the road between Ithriya and Al-Saan. On 13 July, Desert Hawks alongside NDF and Liwa al-Quds  secured villages of Um Tuwaynah, al-Hardaneh and al-Qatshiyah, south of Salamiyah-Ithriyah road, thus securing the supply line to Aleppo city.

References

Conflicts in 2017
Military operations of the Syrian civil war involving the Islamic State of Iraq and the Levant
Military operations of the Syrian civil war involving the Syrian government
Military operations of the Syrian civil war involving Russia
Military operations of the Syrian civil war in 2017
June 2017 events in Syria
Hama